Feri Sistianto (born January 13, 1997) is an Indonesian professional footballer who plays as a centre-back for Liga 2 club Sriwijaya.

Club career

Persela Lamongan
Sistianto was signed for Persela Lamongan to play in Liga 1 in the 2019 season. He made his league debut on 20 September 2019 in a match against Arema at the Surajaya Stadium, Lamongan.

Semen Padang
In 2021, Sistianto signed a contract with Indonesian Liga 2 club Semen Padang. He made his league debut on 11 October against Sriwijaya at the Gelora Sriwijaya Stadium, Palembang.

Honours

Club
PS TNI U-21
 Indonesia Soccer Championship U-21: 2016

References

External links
 Feri Sistianto at Soccerway
 Feri Sistianto at Liga Indonesia

1997 births
Living people
Indonesian footballers
Persela Lamongan players
Association football defenders
People from Kuningan
Sportspeople from West Java
Sriwijaya F.C. players